Utmanzai (Pashto: اتمان زی) is a Pashtun sub-tribe of the larger Kheshgi family in Pakistan and Afghanistan. Utmanzai or Utmankhel tribe was a fighter against the Sikh empire and were the allies of Mir Painda Khan (Nawab of Amb) to combat Maharajah Ranjit Singh They played a considerable part in fighting against the other Pashtun Tribe i.e. Yosufzai, Swatis they also support Nawab Khan Zaman Khan Tanoli in the Battle of Chamla.

Background 

The Utmanzai tribe reside in Charsadda, Topi, Pak Kaya Hund, Kotha, Maini, Batakara in Swabi District, Abbottabad, Sari Pandori, Nara, Hazara, Khalabat Township, Haripur District in Khyber Pakhtunkhwa of Pakistan. In Punjab they are settled in Kasur District and on displacement after construction of Tarbela Dam, have settled in Attock, Jhang, Toba Tek Singh and Khanewal Districts of Punjab.Mansehra[Oghi Shamdhara]

The Utmanzai hold the extreme east of the right bank of the River Indus, also settling in a small area in the south of the Gadoon valley, and early in the 15th century were called across the Indus by the Gujjars of Hazara as allies against the Tareen Afghans, and appropriated the Gandgarh tract from Tarbela to the southern border of Hazara. Prior to the 1960s, a huge population of Utmanzai tribe were living at the both sides of Indus river. People living there were migrated to different places in Pakistan due to the establishment of new Dam called Tarbela Dam near Tarbela Village. Most of them have settled in Haripur Khalabat Township. Some of them have settled in Punjab district Attock (Pak Kaya Swabi, Utmanabad, Pathankot, Islamkot, Sultanpur, Dareak). In Afghanistan Utmanzai lives near to the Pak-Afghan border(Torkham) in the village name Gardee Ghose.

In the times of Ahmad Shah Durani, Baba Said Khan, the head of the Said Khani family of the Utmanzai Pathans, held towns of Kota and Topi in Yusafzai area. He also founded Kalabat town to protect his possessions in Hazara. He was perpetually
fighting with the Other Pashtun tribes such as the Tarins, but managed to hold his own and gradually to extend his estates. His grand grandson,
Sadula Khan, was one of the boldest opponents of the Sikhs, defeating Sardar Hari Singh at Nara in the Gandgarh hills, Hazara in the year 1824. A white pillar was put up by the British Major Abbott to mark the spot where Sadula Khan and his
retainers had fought and conquered.

References

A Glossary of the Tribes and Castes of the Punjab and North-West Frontier Province: L.-Z, Volume 3, Atlantic Publishers & Dist, 1997, Horace Arthur Rose , 9788185297705	532 pages

Sarbani Pashtun tribes